The Lockheed L-133 was an exotic design started in 1939 which was proposed to be the first jet fighter of the United States Army Air Forces (USAAF) during World War II. The radical design was to be powered by two axial-flow turbojets with an unusual blended wing-body canard design capable of 612 mph (985 km/h) in level flight. The USAAF rejected the 1942 proposal, but the effort speeded the development of the USAAF's first successful operational jet fighter, the P-80 Shooting Star, which did see limited service near the end of war. The P-80 was a less radical design with a single British-based Allison J33 engine, with a conventional tail, but it retained a wing which was the same shape as the outer wing sections of the P-38 Lightning.

Development
The Lockheed aviation company was the first in the United States to start work on a jet-powered aircraft. The L-133 design started in 1939 as a number of "Paper Projects" by engineers Clarence L. "Kelly" Johnson, Willis M. Hawkins and Hall L. Hibbard. By 1940 preliminary work on a company-financed jet fighter had been started, which progressed to several different versions on the drawing board.  In the meantime, Lockheed was working on an axial-flow L-1000 turbojet engine of their own design, which was intended to power the culmination of the twin-engine jet fighter project, the Model L-133-02-01.

Throughout World War II, the development of a jet-powered fighter had the potential to bring a decisive advantage in the air battles of the war; as history played out, only Germany built significant numbers of jet fighters before the war ended, but they reached service in the Luftwaffe too late to make a difference.

On March 30, 1942, Lockheed formally submitted the L-133-02-01 to the USAAF for consideration.

The L-133 had a main wing shape that was essentially identical to the outer wing sections of the Lockheed P-38 Lightning.  In many respects the L-133 was far ahead of its time, with futuristic features including:
 canard layout;
 blended wing-body planform; and,
 two engines in a very low-drag integral fuselage location.

The USAAF considered the L-133 to be too advanced for the time, and did not pursue the project. The experience gained with the design served Lockheed well in the development of the USAAF's first operational jet fighter, the P-80 Shooting Star.  Although entering combat service after the war had ended, the P-80 was less advanced than the L-133.  Because the USAAF didn't give the L-133 project the go-ahead, the advanced engines intended for the L-133 had long pauses in their development.  The most expedient engine choice for the P-80 thus became the Allison J33, based on British centrifugal compressor designs. The P-80 was a cheap-to-build single-engine aircraft with a conventional wing and tailplane design, not using the blended wing-body and canard layout of the L-133.

Specifications (L-133-02-01)

See also

References

Notes

Bibliography

 
 Norton, Bill. U.S. Experimental & Prototype Aircraft Projects: Fighters 1939-1945. North Branch, Minnesota: Specialty Press, 2008. .

External links

 tanks45.tripod.com
 www.up-ship.com
 http://www.fantastic-plastic.com/LockheedL-133Page.htm
 https://www.youtube.com/watch?v=O3viiJ4g5G8

L-0133
Cancelled military aircraft projects of the United States
Twinjets
Mid-wing aircraft
Canard aircraft
World War II jet aircraft of the United States